Hessequa Local Municipality (before 24 June 2005 the Langeberg Local Municipality) is a municipality located in the Western Cape Province of South Africa. It is flanked by the lower Breede River to the west and the Gourits River to the east.  the population was 52,642. Its municipality code is WC042. The name Hessequa, meaning "people of the trees", refers to the tribe of indigenous Khoikhoi people.

Geography
It abuts on the Swellendam Municipality to the west, the Kannaland Municipality to the north, the Oudtshoorn Municipality to the northeast, and the Mossel Bay Municipality to the east.

According to the 2011 census the municipality has a population of 52,642 people in 15,873 households. Of this population, 68.5% describe themselves as "Coloured", 23.2% as "White", and 7.4% as "Black African". The first language of 92.4% of the population is Afrikaans, while 3.6% speak English and 2.1% speak Xhosa.

The largest town in the municipality is Riversdale, which as of 2011 has a population of 16,176. Riversdale, which is the location of the municipal headquarters, is located on the Vet River close to the foothills of the Langeberg. Heidelberg (pop. 8,259) and Slangrivier (pop. 3,011) are to the west of Riversdale, while Albertinia (pop. 6,372) is to the east. Stilbaai (pop. 3,514) is on the coast south of Riversdale at the mouth of the Vet River, with Jongensfontein (pop. 355) and Melkhoutfontein (pop. 2,533) nearby. Witsand (pop. 321) is on the western edge of the municipality at the mouth of the Breede River, while Gouritsmond (pop. 515) is on the eastern edge at the mouth of the Gourits River.

History
At the end of the apartheid era, the area that is today the Hessequa Municipality formed part of the South Cape Regional Services Council (RSC). The towns of Riversdale, Heidelberg, Albertinia and Stilbaai were governed by municipal councils elected by their white residents. The coloured residents of Riversdale, Heidelberg and Theronsville (Albertinia) were governed by management committees subordinate to the white councils. The seaside resorts of Witsand, Jongensfontein and Gouritsmond were governed by elected local councils, and the town of Slangrivier was governed by a board of management.

While the negotiations to end apartheid were taking place a process was established for local authorities to agree on voluntary mergers. In March 1992, the Municipality of Riversdale and the Riversdale Management Committee merged into a single municipal council, and in August 1992 a similar merger took place in Heidelberg.

After the national elections of 1994 a process of local government transformation began, in which negotiations were held between the existing local authorities, political parties, and local community organisations. As a result of these negotiations, the existing local authorities were dissolved and transitional local councils (TLCs) were created for each town and village. The smaller seaside resorts were also combined with larger towns.
 Riversdale TLC replaced the Municipality of Riversdale in October 1994.
 Heidelberg TLC replaced the Municipality of Heidelberg and the Witsand Local Council in December 1994.
 Albertinia-Gourits TLC replaced the Municipality of Albertinia, the Theronsville Management Committee and the Gouritsmond Local Council in January 1995.
 Stilbaai TLC replaced the Municipality of Stilbaai and the Jongensfontein Local Council in January 1995.
 Slangrivier TLC replaced the Slangrivier Management Board in January 1995.

The transitional councils were initially made up of members nominated by the various parties to the negotiations, until May 1996 when elections were held. At the time of these elections the Albertinia-Gourits TLC was dissolved and replaced by separate TLCs for Albertinia and Gouritsmond. The South Cape District Council was established in place of the South Cape RSC, and transitional representative councils (TRCs) were elected to represent rural areas outside the TLCs on the District Council. The area that was to become Hessequa Municipality formed part of the Langeberg TRC.

At the local elections of December 2000 the TLCs and TRCs were dissolved and the Langeberg Municipality was established as a single local authority. At the same election the South Cape District Council was also dissolved and replaced by the Eden District Municipality. In 2005 the name of the local municipality was changed from Langeberg to Hessequa. (The Langeberg name was subsequently reused for the municipality formerly known as Breede River/Winelands.)

Politics 

The municipal council consists of seventeen members elected by mixed-member proportional representation. Nine councillors are elected by first-past-the-post voting in nine wards, while the remaining eight are chosen from party lists so that the total number of party representatives is proportional to the number of votes received. In the election of 1 November 2021 the Democratic Alliance (DA) won a majority of seats on the council.

The following table shows the results of the 2021 election.

References

External links 
 

Local municipalities of the Garden Route District Municipality